The 2016–17 Appalachian State Mountaineers men's basketball team represented Appalachian State University during the 2016–17 NCAA Division I men's basketball season. The Mountaineers, led by third-year head coach Jim Fox, played their home games at the George M. Holmes Convocation Center in Boone, North Carolina as members of the Sun Belt Conference. They finished the season 9–21, 4–14 in Sun Belt play to finish in 11th place. They lost in the first round of the Sun Belt tournament to Troy.

Previous season
The Mountaineers finished the 2015–16 season 9–22, 7–13 in Sun Belt play to finish in a tie for ninth place. They failed to qualify for the Sun Belt tournament.

Roster

Schedule and results

|-
!colspan=9 style=| Exhibition

|-
!colspan=9 style=| Non-conference regular season

|-
!colspan=9 style=| Sun Belt Conference regular season

|-
!colspan=9 style=| Sun Belt tournament

References

Appalachian State Mountaineers men's basketball seasons
Appalachian State
2017 in sports in North Carolina
2016 in sports in North Carolina